Conca de Barberà is a comarca (county) in the province of Tarragona, Catalonia, Spain. At its creation in 1936, it contained 23 municipalities, but in 1990, several of these were amalgamated; Rojals was combined with Montblanc, and Montbrió de la Marca was amalgamated with Sarral. Also in 1990, Vallfogona de Riucorb was moved from the Segarra comarca. This resulted in the current total of 22 municipalities.

Geography
The comarca of Conca de Barberà is divided into three geographical zones. The lowland sector consists of the physical Conca de Barberà region: the valleys of the Rivers Francolí and Anguera (Conca means a river valley, and Barberà is one of the principal villages in the valley). The capital of the comarca, Montblanc is at the southern end of this sector at the confluence of these two rivers. The northern edge of the Conca is marked by the Serra del Tallat escarpment, which separates it from the Baixa Segarra ("Lower Segarra") region, and the south-western zone of the comarca is formed by the Prades Mountains, part of the Catalan Pre-Coastal Range. which straddle the border between Conca de Barberà and the adjoining comarcas of Alt Camp, Baix Camp, Garrigues and Priorat. These rounded limestone outcrops are clad in forests of pine, oak and chestnut. The climate of the comarca is transitional between a Mediterranean climate and the continental inland climate. The rainfall averages , mostly falling in spring and autumn. The comarca has a rich and diverse flora and fauna.

Wind power
The northern Serra del Tallat region is the site of several wind farms. When the Catalan Government’s Energy Plan 2006–2015 was prepared with proposals that affected the comarca of Conca de Barberà, opinion was divided. Some municipalities favoured the construction of the wind turbines as generating income which would benefit the community, while others objected to the imposition of such projects by the Catalan authorities without sufficient input by the affected municipalities. In January 2012 it was announced that wind power production in Catalonia had reached 1,000 megawatts, enough to supply over four percent of Catalonia's power needs.

Municipalities

References

External links

 Official website 
 Information about Conca de Barberà on the site of the la Generalitat de Catalunya  

 
Comarques of the Province of Tarragona